It Came From San Antonio is the sixth album by American singer/songwriter Bruce Robison. It was released in 2007 on Premium Records.

Track listing
All songs (Robison) except where noted
“It Came from San Antonio” - 2:56 	   	
“When It Rains” - 5:02 		
“Lifeline” - 3:29 		
“My Baby Now” - 3:25 		
“Anywhere But Here” (Robison, Monte Warden)- 5:19
“What Makes You Say” (Robison, Jack Ingram)- 3:51
“23A” - 3:40

Releases

Critical reception

William Ruhlmann of AllMusic said It Came from San Antonio was moderate while David Cantwell of No Depression said the album's songs provided an instruction manual for up-and-coming songwriters.

References

External links 
Bruce Robison website
Premium Records website

Bruce Robison albums
2007 albums